Klyonovsky is a rural locality (a settlement) in Dyatkovsky District, Bryansk Oblast, Russia. The population was 25 as of 2010.

Geography 
Klyonovsky is located 31 km southwest of Dyatkovo (the district's administrative centre) by road. Starye Umyslichi is the nearest rural locality.

References 

Rural localities in Dyatkovsky District